Josiah Gorgas (July 1, 1818 – May 15, 1883) was one of the few Northern-born Confederate generals and was later president of the University of Alabama.

As chief of ordnance during the American Civil War, Gorgas managed to keep the Confederate armies well supplied with weapons and ammunition, despite the Union blockade, and even though the South had hardly any munitions industry before the war began. In this effort he also worked closely with the Fraser, Trenholm shipping company that brought in shipments of ordnance by means of blockade runners. He kept diaries during the Civil War which are now a popular subject of study for historians.

Early life
Josiah Gorgas was born near Elizabethtown in Lancaster County, Pennsylvania. He was graduated from West Point in 1841 and was assigned to the Ordnance Department. He served in the Mexican–American War and was promoted to captain in 1855. In 1853, he married Amelia Gayle, daughter of former Alabama governor John Gayle.

Gorgas served in arsenals in different parts of the country before the Civil War broke out. Early in his career, Gorgas served at Watervliet Arsenal near Troy, New York, and at the Detroit Arsenal. Following the Mexican–American War, Gorgas served in Pennsylvania and in November 1851 was transferred to Fort Monroe in Virginia. There he began his association with the Tredegar Iron Company, which would become an important Southern foundry once the Civil War began.  Gorgas went on to serve at the Mount Vernon Arsenal north of Mobile, Alabama beginning in 1853. He was commanding the Frankford Arsenal when he resigned from the United States Army on March 21, 1861 (effective April 3).

Civil War
In the years prior to the Civil War, the Gorgas had been in opposition to the Republicans and abolitionists. He also made requests for transfer to arsenals in the South on multiple occasions. Ultimately the decision to participate in the secession, apparently motivated as much because of professional conflict with his commander as by political principle, he moved to Richmond and became chief of ordnance for the Confederacy with the rank of major. Having served in nearly every arsenal in the nation he was the perfect choice for the position. In this capacity, he worked to create an armaments industry almost from scratch. The South had no foundry except the Tredegar Iron Works. There were no rifle works except small arsenals in Richmond, and Fayetteville, North Carolina, plus the captured machines from the U.S. arsenal in Harpers Ferry.

In the procurement of arms Gorgas also corresponded with Charles Prioleau, who headed Trenholm's Liverpool office, arranging for the shipping of arms and other supplies to the Confederacy. Most of the arms sent to the Confederacy departed from Liverpool. During the summer of 1861, Gorgas stockpiled supplies and prepared his first load of cargo while the Trenholm company procured a suitable ship for the voyage. A 1,200 ton iron-hulled steamer, the Bermuda, was chosen to make the voyage.

Gorgas established armories and foundries and created the Nitre Bureau to search for alternative sources of nitre. He implemented President Davis's wish and helped facilitate the commissioning of George Washington Rains, a North Carolina native and West Point graduate with extensive military service who was working as a Northern industrialist when the war broke out. Rains, a scientist of high order, established the Augusta Powder Works in Augusta, Georgia, which supplied almost all of the powder for the Confederacy. Thanks to his and Rains's efforts, the Southern armies never lacked weapons or gunpowder, though they were short on almost everything else. On November 10, 1864, Gorgas was promoted to brigadier general.

Postbellum
After the war, Gorgas purchased an interest in the Brierfield Furnace in Bibb County, near Ashby in Alabama, which had helped supply the Confederate Naval Ordnance Works in Selma. The other directors appointed him to manage the iron works and he moved his family to the furnace site.  Due to high operating and management costs he was forced to lease the iron works after just a couple of years in operation.

In 1870, Gorgas accepted a position as the 2nd vice chancellor of the newly established University of the South in Sewanee, Tennessee. His position there was marked by discord with the board of trustees and the stress of keeping the university financially afloat. A student residence hall built as part of the Sewanee Military Academy was later renamed "Gorgas Hall" in his honor.

In 1878, Gorgas was elected 8th president of the University of Alabama.  When he was forced to resign due to ill health, the trustees created the position of librarian for him, the position in which his wife was to succeed him. Upon his resignation as president, the university allowed the Gorgas family to move into the Pratt House, which also housed the campus post office and student hospital. The building had originally been the 1829 dining hall and later converted to a faculty residence in 1847.  The building was dedicated as a memorial to the family in 1944, and became a museum now known as the Gorgas House upon the death of the last two surviving Gorgas children in 1953.

Death and legacy
Gorgas died at the age of 65 in Tuscaloosa in 1883, and was buried at Evergreen Cemetery.

His widow Amelia served as the university's librarian for 23 years after his death and the main university library is named the Amelia Gayle Gorgas Library in her honor. Their oldest son, William Crawford Gorgas (born 1854) served as  Surgeon General of the U.S. Army and is credited with implementing preventive measures against yellow fever and malaria that allowed for the completion of the Panama Canal.

See also

 Blockade runners of the American Civil War
 Gorgas machine gun
 List of American Civil War generals (Confederate)

Notes

The birthplace of Josiah Gorgas on various websites is erroneously listed as "Running Pumps, PA."  Josiah was actually born in a house adjacent to the family's cotton factory near the Running Pumps Hotel, just north of Elizabethtown, Lancaster County, Pennsylvania.  Josiah's father once owned the Running Pumps Hotel, but due to financial difficulties, he had to sell the Running Pumps Hotel in 1813, five years before Josiah's birth in 1818.  (Source:  Winters Heritage House Museum, Elizabethtown, Pennsylvania.)

References
  Url
  Url
 
 Vandiver, Frank E., ed., The Civil War Diary of General Josiah Gorgas (University of Alabama, 1947)

External links

 Josiah Gorgas in Encyclopedia Virginia
 Brigadier-General Josiah Gorgas- the third of "Sewanee's Five Generals"
 Smithsonian: West Point in the making of America
 Josiah Gorgas article, Encyclopedia of Alabama
 Josiah and Amelia Gorgas Family papers, W.S. Hoole Special Collections Library, The University of Alabama.
 

1818 births
1883 deaths
People from Elizabethtown, Pennsylvania
Confederate States Army brigadier generals
American military personnel of the Mexican–American War
United States Military Academy alumni
Sewanee: The University of the South people
Northern-born Confederates
Presidents of the University of Alabama
People of Virginia in the American Civil War
Military personnel from Pennsylvania